Isaac ben Merwan ha-Levi (flourished in the first third of the 12th century) was a Provençal rabbi and Talmudist; he was the elder son of Merwan of Narbonne.

As highly respected in the community as his father, he was elected rabbi of Narbonne. He is often quoted, his Talmudic decisions being regarded as decisive. He directed the yeshibah, and several of his pupils achieved distinction, among them being his nephew Moses ben Joseph, Moses ben Jacob ha-Nasi, and Abraham ben Isaac, "ab bet din" of Narbonne.

See also

 Hachmei Provence

References
Henri Gross, Gallia Judaica, p. 413

External links

12th-century French rabbis
Provençal Jews
Clergy from Narbonne
Levites
French Orthodox rabbis
Exponents of Jewish law